Carroll Academy (CA) is a private K-12 school in Carrollton, Mississippi.

The Atlantic identified it as a segregation academy, a school created to thwart racial integration. In 2010 it had no African-American students.

The school was established in the ex-Jennie McBride School on August 28, 1969.

In 2011 the Southern Poverty Law Center (SPLC) stated that the Council of Conservative Citizens funds the school.

As of 2018 the school had 309 students, of which 305 were white and 4 were of two or more races.

See also
 Carroll County School District – The public school system of the county
 J. Z. George High School – Public high school
 Vaiden High School – Former high school in Vaiden in Carroll County

References

External links
 Carroll Academy

Private K-12 schools in Mississippi
Segregation academies
1969 establishments in Mississippi
Educational institutions established in 1969